"El Reloj Cucú" (English: The Cuckoo Clock) is the fifth radio single and the fourth track from Maná's fourth studio album, Cuando los Ángeles Lloran in 1995. On the week of March 16, 1996 the song debuted at number forty on the U.S. Billboard Hot Latin Tracks and after three weeks later on March 30, 1996 it reached its highest point at the number thirty-four spot for only one week. It would stay for a total of 3 weeks.

In 2021 it was re-released featuring 12-year-old Mexican singer Mabel Vázquez.

Charts

Covers
Maelo Ruiz a performed a salsa version of the song which peaked at #20 on the Billboard Tropical Songs chart.

References

1996 singles
Maná songs
Spanish-language songs
Songs written by Fher Olvera
Warner Music Latina singles
1995 songs